Svartelva is a river in Innlandet county, Norway. The river passes very close to the lake Rokosjøen in  Løten before heading wester to Ådalsbruk. At the village of Ilseng, it is joined by a tributary, the river Lageråa. From the point where the Lageråa joins, the river forms the border between Stange and Hamar municipalities, continuing until the outlet at Åkersvika into the large lake Mjøsa.

See also
List of rivers in Norway

References

Stange
Hamar
Løten
Rivers of Innlandet